"Brand New Couch" is the first episode of the second season of American animated television series BoJack Horseman. It was written by Raphael Bob-Waksberg and directed by Amy Winfrey. The episode was released in the United States, along with the rest of season two, via Netflix on July 17, 2015. George Takei provides his voice in a guest appearance in the episode.

In 2015, the episode was nominated for Best Animated Television Production at the 43rd Annie Awards.

Plot 
The season's first episode picks up shortly after the season one finale. BoJack decides to adopt a positive life attitude, hoping to turn his life around, but it affects his job performance where he is starring in the title role of the Secretariat movie.

References

External links 
 "Brand New Couch" on Netflix
 

2015 American television episodes
BoJack Horseman episodes